AD 35, AD35 or AD-35 may refer to:

 AD 35, the 35th year of the Common Era
 Ad35, adenovirus serotype 35
 , a WWII-era U.S. Navy Shenandoah-class destroyer tender

See also

 AD (disambiguation)
 35 (disambiguation)